Brayan López may refer to:

 Brayan Lopez (athlete) (born 1997),  Italian sprinter
 Brayan López (footballer, born 1987), Colombian footballer 
 Brayan López (footballer, born 1990),  Nicaragua-Costa Rican footballer